The Little Palmiste River is a river of Grenada. In the parish of St. John, it flows from the palmiste dig. The dig structure was built over three centuries ago during the French period of colonization of Grenada.

See also
List of rivers of Grenada

References
 GEOnet Names Server
Grenada map

Rivers of Grenada